Anandalok Puraskar or Anandalok Awards ceremony is an award ceremony for Bengali film in India. The Anandalok, only film magazine in Bengali language, published from Ananda Publishers and Ananda Bazar Patrika presents this award (Puraskar). The magazine was started on 25 January 1975 and the awards ceremony was started in 1998.

Awards

Best Films
Best Director
Best Actor
Best Actress
Best Supporting Actor
Best Supporting Actress
Best Screenplay
Best Cinematographer
Best Art Director
Best Editor
Best Music Director
Best Lyricist
Best Male Playback
Best Female Playback
Best Make Up Man
Most Promising Director
Most Promising Actor
Most Promising Actress
Best Action Hero

Special awards

Hindi section

Anandalok Award for Best Actor (Hindi)
Anandalok Award for Best Actress (Hindi)
Anandalok Award for Best Film (Hindi)

Previous awards

2010
 Best Film – Le Chakka Srijan arts
 Best Director – Raj Chakraborty for Le chakka
 Best Hindi Feature Film – Rajneeti
 Best Actor (Hindi) – Abhishek Bachchan for Raavan
 Best Actress (Hindi) – Aishwarya Rai Bachchan for Raavan
 Best Bengali Actor – Dev for (Le chakka)
 Best Bengali Actress – Payel Sarkar for (Le chakka)
 Best Debut (Male)- Joy Mukherjee for Target
 Best Debut (Female) – Barkha Sengupta for  Dui Prithibi
 Best Music Director – Indradeep Dasgupta for Le chakka
 Lifetime Achievement Award – Sharmila Tagore2009
 Best Actress (Critics' Choice) – Rani Mukerji for Dil Bole Hadippa!
 Best Actor popular – Neil Nitin Mukesh for New York

2008
 Best Film – Chirodini Tumi Je Amar
 Best Director-Raj Chakraborty for Chirodini Tumi Je Amar
 Best Actor-Rahul Banerjee for Chirodini Tumi Je Amar
 Best Actress-Priyanka Sarkar for Chirodini Tumi Je Amar
 Best Music-Jeet Ganguly for Chirodini Tumi Je Amar
 Best Action Hero-Hiran Chatterjee for Nabab Nandini
 Best Actress (Hindi)- Prachi Desai for Rock On!!

 Best Film Chirodini Tumi Je Amar
 Chalo Let's Go
 Khela
 Nabab Nandini
 Kailashe Kelenkari
 Best Director Haranath Chakraborty for Nabab Nandini
 Raj Chakraborty for Chirodini Tumi Je Amar
 Anjan Dutt for Chalo Let's Go
 Sandip Ray for  Kailashe Kelenkari
 Arjun Chakraborty for Tolly Lights
 Rituparno Ghosh for Khela
 Best Actor Prosenjit for Khela
 Sabyasachi Chakrabarty for  Kailashe Kelenkari
 Jisshu Sengupta for  Bor Asbe Ekhuni
 Rahul Banerjee for Chirodini Tumi Je Amar
 Jeet for Krishnakanter Will
 Dev for Premer Kahini
 Best Actress Koyel Mullick for Nabab Nandini
 Subhashree Ganguly for Bajimaat
 Priyanka Sarkar for Chirodini Tumi Je Amar
 Sreelekha Mitra for Tolly Lights
 Rituparna Sengupta for  Chander Bari
 Best Music Jeet Ganguly for Chirodini Tumi Je Amar
 Indradeep Dasgupta for Bor Asbe Ekhuni
 Neel Dutt for Chalo Let's Go
 Arundhuti Roychowdhury-Shibaji Chatterje for Chander Bari

2007

Own for 2007
 Best Film – Minister Fatakeshto
 Best Music – Pritam Chakraborty
 Lifetime Achievement Award – Moushumi Chatterjee
 Best Action Hero – Anubhav Mohanty for Kalishankar
 Best Actor- Mithun Chakraborty for Minister Fatakesto
 Best Actress- Rituparna Sengupta for Anuranan
 Best Actress (Hindi)-Vidya Balan for  Bhool Bhulaiyaa
 Best Debut- Subhashree Ganguly for Bajimaat

Nominated for 2007

2006
 Best Cinematography – Abhik Mukhopadhyay for Dosar
 Best Director – Prabhat Roy for Shubhodristi
 Best Film – Shubhodristi
 Best Music- Jeet Ganguly for Shubhodristi
 Best Playback Singer (Male)- Pranjal Bakshi for Bhalobasar Anek Naam
 Best Actor – Prasenjit for Dosar
 Best Actress – Sreelekha Mitra for Kantatar
 Best Upcoming Star (Female) – Koel Mallick for Shubhodristi
 Best Upcoming Star (Male)-Jeet for Priyotama
 Best Villain – Rajatava Dutta for M.L.A. Fatakesto
 Best Actress (Bollywood) – Rani Mukerji for Black
 Best Actor (Bollywood) – Amitabh Bachchan for Black
 Best Film (Bollywood) – Black

2005

 Best Director -Rituparno Ghosh for Antarmahal
 Best Film -Antarmahal
 Best Playback Singer (Female) -Shreya Ghoshal for Manik
 Best Playback Singer (Male) -sonu nigam for Bandhan
 Best Actor -Jeet for Manik
 Best Actress -Debashree Roy for Tista
 Best TV Serial – Bohnishikha
 Best Telefilm – Palatak
 Best Makeover – Sudipta Chakraborty
 Best Actress (Mega serial) – Indrani Halder (Bohnishikha)
 Best Actor (Mega serial) – Saswata Chattopadhyay (Ekdin Pratidin)
 Best Glamour Queen – Rituparna Sengupta
 Best Actress (Bollywood) – Rani Mukerji for Hum Tum
 Best Actor (Bollywood) — Abhishek Bachchan
 Best Film (Bollywood) – Veer-Zaara

2004

 Best Director: Anjan Das for Iti Srikanto
 Best Film : Aalo
 Best Playback Singer (Female):Arundhati Holme Chowdhury for  Aalo
 Best Playback Singer (Male):Babul Supriyo for Sangee
 Critics Choice :Koneenika Bandyopadhyay for Aabar Asibo Phire
 Lifetime Achievement Award : Ranjit Mallick
 Best Actor : Sabyasachi Chakrabarty for  Bombayer Bombete
 Best Actor (Hindi): Saif Ali Khan
 Best Actress : Vidya Balan for Bhalo Theko
 Best Actress (Hindi): Preity Zinta for Kal Ho Naa Ho
 Best Director (Hindi) : Rajkumar Hirani for Munnabhai M.B.B.S.
 Best Film (Hindi) : Munnabhai M.B.B.S.
 Best Newcomer (Hindi) : Ashmit Patel for Murder

2003
 Best Director : Buddhadeb Dasgupta for Mando Meyer Upakshan
 Best Playback Singer (Female) :Swagatalakshmi Dasgupta for Chokher Bali
 Best Playback Singer (Male):Srikanta Acharya for Aamar Bhuban
 Critics Choice : Konkana Sen Sharma for  Mr. and Mrs. Iyer
 Best Actor : Jeet for Sathi
 Best Actress: Aishwarya Rai for Chokher Bali
 Best Debut (Female): Rimi Sen for Hangama
 Best Debut (Male):Shahid Kapoor for Ishq Vishk
 Creator of the Most Outstanding Film of the Year: Rakesh Roshan for Koi... Mil Gaya
 Outstanding Music Director: Rajesh Roshan for Koi... Mil Gaya
 Outstanding Performance of the Year (Female): Kareena Kapoor for Main Prem Ki Diwani Hoon
 Outstanding Performance of the Year (Male): Hrithik Roshan for Koi... Mil Gaya

2002
 Best Film: Dekha
 Best Playback Singer (Female): Swagatalakshmi Dasgupta for  Dekha
 Lifetime Achievement Award: Hema Malini
 Best Actor: Sabyasachi Chakrabarty for Ek Je Achhe Kanya
 Best Actress: Aparna Sen for Titlee
 Best Debut: Madhur Bhandarkar for Chandni Bar
 Editor's Choice: Dia Mirza and Vivek Oberoi

2001
 Lifetime Achievement Award- Sabitri Chattopadhyay & Shammi Kapoor Best Actor Mithun Chakraborty
 Best Actress Aparna Sen
 Editor's Choice Raveena Tandon

2000
 Best Screenplay Anjan Chowdhury Jiban Niye Khela
 Best Story Samaresh Majumdar Atmiyoswajan
 Lifetime Achievement Award Sunil Dutt
 Special Jury Award Indrani Dutta Swapno Niye
 Best Actress in a Supporting Role Rituparna Sengupta Atmiyoswajan
 Best Actor Soumitra Chatterjee AtmiyoswajanSoumitra Chatterjee Asukh
 Best Actress Indrani Haldar Anu
 Best Debut Shilajit Majumdar Asukh
 Editor's Choice Tabu Hu Tu Tu
 Voice of the Millennium Manna Dey

1999
 Best Art Direction = Rupchand Kundu Surya Kanya
 Best Cinematography Soumendu Roy Surya Kanya
 Best Director Biresh Chattopadhyay Surya Kanya
 Best Editing Arghakamal Mitra Dahan
 Best Film Dahan
 Best Lyrics Nachiketa Chakraborty Hathat Brishti
 Best Music Nachiketa Chakraborty Hathat Brishti
 Best Playback Singer (Female) Swagatalakshmi Dasgupta Surya KanyaSreeradha Bandhopadhaya Surya Kanya
 Best Playback Singer (Male) Kumar Sanu For Ami Sei Meye Best Screenplay Joy Mukherjee Sanghat
 Best Story Taposi Roychoudhury Surya Kanya
 Lifetime Achievement Award Tapan Sinha
 Special Jury Award Dolon Ray SanghatFirdous Ahmed Hathat Brishti
 Best Actor in a Supporting Role Manoj Mitra Hathat Brishti
 Best Actress in a Supporting Role Mamata Shankar Surya Kanya
 Best Actor Prasenjit Ranakshetra
 Best Actress Indrani Haldar DahanRituparna Sengupta Dahan
 Editor's Choice Jaya BachchanMithun Chakraborty
 Living Legend Rajesh Khanna
 Special Editor Award Jaya BachchanMithun Chakraborty

1998
 Best Art Direction Goutam Bose Moner Manush
 Best Cinematography Venu Lal Darja
 Best Director Buddhadeb Dasgupta Lal Darja
 Best Editing Oankar Bakri Gane Bhuban Bhoriye Debo
 Best Film Sedin Chaitramas
 Best Lyrics Jatileswar Mukhopadhyay DamuMohit Chottopadhayay Damu
 Best Music Jatileswar Mukhopadhyay DamuPartha Sengupta Damu
 Best Playback Singer (Female) Swagatalakshmi Dasgupta Sedin Chaitramas
 Best Playback Singer (Male) Kumar Sanu Gane Bhuban Bhoriye Debo'
 Best Screenplay Mohit Chottopadhaya Damu
 Best Story Bimal Kar Nayantara
 Lifetime Achievement Award Dev AnandSoumitra Chatterjee
 Special Jury Award Rabi Ghosh NayantaraSaswata Chattopadhyay Nayantara
 Best Actor in a Supporting Role Ashad Lal Darja
 Best Actress in a Supporting Role Alokananda Ray Sedin Chaitramas
 Best Actor Subhendu Chattopadhyay Lal Darja
 Best ActressMamata Shankar Nayantara

References

External links
www.Bhalobasa.in Anandalok Awards 2010
www.gomolo.in Anandalok Awards
 www.bollywoodhungama.com Anandalok Awards

 
Civil awards and decorations of West Bengal
1998 establishments in West Bengal